Hennadiy Viktorovych Balashov (born 20 February 1961, Dnipro, USSR) is a Ukrainian businessman, blogger, politician and leader of 5.10 political party. He is an advocate of a radical reform of Ukraine's tax system, so-called "Tax Paradise for humanity".

Biography
During Euromaidan events, Balashov sided with the protesters and was actively campaigning for his ideas, calling for the introduction of 5.10 system. At the beginning of March, as the crisis in Crimea was deepening, he travelled to Simferopol, but was kidnapped by allegedly local self-defense forces. Upon his release and return to Kyiv, Balashov said that he was kidnapped, robbed and was being beaten for eight hours by local bandits.

2014 Ukrainian presidential election 
In the early elections of the President of Ukraine in 2014, Gennadiy Balashov and his party "5.10" supported Petro Poroshenko in order not to let Yulia Tymoshenko win the election.

2019 Ukrainian presidential election 
On 19 September 2018, the leader of the 5.10 party, Gennadiy Balashov, announced his intention to nominate his candidature for the presidential election of Ukraine on 31 March 2019.

Balashov urged party members and party supporters to finance his election campaign through contributions to the party account. The reports of the party indicated that at the beginning of 2019 1.2 million UAH were collected. This is 47% of the collateral (UAH 2.5 million), which should be submitted by the candidate to the CEC for registration. Balashov pledged to add the rest of his own money.

On 15 January, registration documents were submitted to the CEC. On 18 January, the CEC approved the candidate.

Family 
Balashov has a wife and three children – daughters Julia, Daria and son Gennady.

Scandals

Criminal Case 
On January 22, 2021, the National Police of Ukraine opened a criminal case against Balashov as he received funds totaling $28,000 as an investment in the construction of an elite apartment building. However, after the house was built, he did not give the investors their funds, but instead began to lease the premises of the house for office rent.

Illegal construction in the UNESCO protected zone 
The erection of a house by Balashov in the buffer zone of the UNESCO World Heritage Site "St. Sophia Cathedral and Adjacent Monasteries, Kyiv-Pechersk Lavra" caused a high resonance in society. Architects and archaeologists, including a representative of the Institute of Archeology of the National Academy of Sciences of Ukraine, said that Balashov built his house with numerous violations, which gives UNESCO the full right to exclude the Cathedral of St. Sophia and the adjacent monastic structures, the Kiev-Pechersk Lavra from the list of World Heritage Sites.

Language Statements 
During the discussion of the Ukrainian language legislature at one of the all-Ukrainian TV channels, Balashov said that he spoke Russian out of principle

Bibliography 
 "How to become an adventurer. Reflections of a millionaire "(2011)
 "The monarchy of the entrepreneur. How to become king? "(2014)

Awards and honors 
 Awarded the Order of Merit of the III degree.

References

1961 births
Living people
Businesspeople from Dnipro
Third convocation members of the Verkhovna Rada
Oles Honchar Dnipro National University alumni
Chevaliers of the Order of Merit (Ukraine)
Ukrainian libertarians
Ukrainian radio personalities
People of the annexation of Crimea by the Russian Federation
Candidates in the 2019 Ukrainian presidential election
Politicians from Dnipro